Put 'Em Up is a 1928 American silent Western film directed by Edgar Lewis and starring Fred Humes, Gloria Grey and Gilbert Holmes.

Plot

Cast
 Fred Humes as Tom Evans  
 Gloria Grey as Helen Turner  
 Gilbert Holmes as Shorty Mullins  
 Tom London as Jake Lannister  
 Harry Semels as Lloyd Turner  
 Ben Corbett as Tradin' Sam  
 Charles Colby as Dobby Flinn  
 Bert Starkey as Slim Hansom

References

Bibliography
 Langman, Larry. American Film Cycles: The Silent Era. Greenwood Publishing Group, 1998.

External links
 

1928 films
1928 Western (genre) films
Films directed by Edgar Lewis
Universal Pictures films
American black-and-white films
Silent American Western (genre) films
Films with screenplays by George H. Plympton
1920s English-language films
1920s American films